The Onggi Folk Museum, located in Seoul, South Korea is a private museum specializing in onggi, Korean earthenware which is used for storage and utilitarian purposes. It was established as the Goryeo Folk Museum (고려민속박물관) in 1991 and later was changed to the current name. The museum consists of three-story building and an outdoor exhibition hall where 3,300 items of onggi and other items such as dancheong patterns, Korean traditional decorative coloring used for building are exhibited.

See also
List of museums in South Korea

References

External links
The official site

Museums in Seoul
Folk museums in South Korea
Museums established in 1991
1991 establishments in South Korea